The Popular Duke Ellington is a studio album by American pianist, composer and bandleader Duke Ellington featuring many of the tunes associated with his orchestra rerecorded in 1966 and released on the RCA label in 1967.

Reception
The Allmusic review by Scott Yanow awarded the album 3 stars and states "Since the material is all very familiar, and mostly quite concise few surprises occur. But Ellington fans will enjoy this well-played effort".

Track listing
All compositions by Duke Ellington except as indicated
 "Take the "A" Train" (Billy Strayhorn) - 4:40
 "I Got It Bad (and That Ain't Good)" (Ellington, Paul Francis Webster) - 2:36
 "Perdido" (Juan Tizol) - 3:14
 "Mood Indigo" (Ellington, Barney Bigard, Irving Mills)  5:10
 "Black and Tan Fantasy" (Ellington, James "Bubber" Miley) - 5:12
 "The Twitch" - 3:11
 "Solitude" (Ellington, Mills, Eddie DeLange) - 3:36
 "Do Nothin' Till You Hear from Me" (Ellington, Bob Russell) - 1:55
 "The Mooche" (Ellington, Mills) - 5:36
 "Sophisticated Lady" (Ellington, Mills, Mitchell Parish) - 3:02
 "Creole Love Call" - 3:56
 "Caravan" (Ellington, Mills, Tizol) - 5:27 Bonus track on CD reissue
 "Wings and Things" (Johnny Hodges) - 1:59 Bonus track on CD reissue
 "Do Nothin' Till You Hear from Me" [alternate take] (Ellington, Russell) - 1:56 Bonus track on CD reissue
Recorded at RCA Hollywood Recording Studio B in Los Angeles, CA on May 9 (tracks 1, 2, 9, 12 & 14), May 10 (tracks 5, 6, 10 & 11) and May 11 (tracks 3, 4, 7, 8 & 13), 1966.

Personnel
Duke Ellington – piano
Cat Anderson, Mercer Ellington, Herb Jones, Cootie Williams - trumpet
Lawrence Brown, Buster Cooper - trombone
Chuck Connors - bass trombone
Russell Procope - alto saxophone, clarinet
Johnny Hodges - alto saxophone
Jimmy Hamilton - tenor saxophone, clarinet
Paul Gonsalves - tenor saxophone
Harry Carney - baritone saxophone
John Lamb - bass
Sam Woodyard - drums

References

RCA Records albums
Duke Ellington albums
1968 albums